The New Mission Theater is a historic building, built in 1916 and is located at 2550 Mission Street in San Francisco, California. 

The building is listed as a San Francisco Designated Landmark since May 27, 2004; and listed as one of the National Register of Historic Places since November 9, 2001.

History 
The building originally designed by the Reid Brothers. It was renovated for the Nasser Brothers Theaters circuit in 1932 by Timothy Pflueger, who transformed it into Art Deco-style. It boasts a  marquee sign that is a local landmark. In its early life, it showed mostly "B" movies. 

In the 1960s and 1970s, it specialized in children's fare. The theater closed in 1993 and became a furniture store. It was purchased by the City College of San Francisco, who proposed to raze it and build new campus facilities. But a group called "Save The New Mission Theater", headed by Alfonso Felder, lobbied to stop the college from destroying the theater.

The building was renovated by the Alamo Drafthouse Cinema chain, and re-opened as a movie theater and bar in December 2015.

See also 

 List of San Francisco Designated Landmarks
 National Register of Historic Places listings in San Francisco

References

Theatres in San Francisco
Cinemas and movie theaters in the San Francisco Bay Area
Mission District, San Francisco
Event venues established in 1916
1916 establishments in California
Theatres completed in 1932
1932 establishments in California
Art Deco architecture in California
Reid & Reid buildings
San Francisco Designated Landmarks
National Register of Historic Places in San Francisco